Héctor Ruvalcaba Cruz (born 26 June 1997) is a Mexican male swimmer who competed at the collegiate level for the Incarnate Word Cardinals.

Born in Guadalajara, Ruvalcaba began swimming at age eight and moved to Tijuana with his family as a teenager. 

Ruvalcaba started competing at the international level in the 2017 Summer Universiade. He won a silver medal in the 200m butterfly and a bronze in the 200m individual medley at the 2018 Central American and Caribbean Games. He later competed at the 2019 Pan American Games, where he reached two finals. During the COVID-19 pandemic, Ruvalcaba returned home to Tijuana to train in hopes of qualifying for the delayed 2020 Summer Olympics. He joined the LA Current for the 2021 International Swimming League.

References

External links
 Incarnate Word Cardinals bio

Living people
1997 births
Mexican male swimmers
Incarnate Word Cardinals athletes
College men's swimmers in the United States
Central American and Caribbean Games silver medalists for Mexico
Central American and Caribbean Games bronze medalists for Mexico
Central American and Caribbean Games medalists in swimming
Competitors at the 2018 Central American and Caribbean Games
Pan American Games competitors for Mexico
Swimmers at the 2019 Pan American Games
Sportspeople from Guadalajara, Jalisco
Sportspeople from Tijuana